Philipp Peter (born 6 April 1969 in Vienna) is a race car driver from Austria.

He started in junior formula cars with the highlight winning the Austria Formula 3 Cup in 1992. He represented Austria in the 1990 EFDA Nations Cup and also raced in Indy Lights finishing third in the Championship in 1999.

In 2003 he won the 12 Hours of Sebring in a Team Joest Audi R8 with teammates Marco Werner and Frank Biela. He previously competed in Indy Lights in 1998 and 1999, capturing victories in 1999 at Long Beach, Portland and Michigan and finishing 11th and 3rd in series points in his two years, respectively.

In 2006 Peter raced in the FIA GT Championship for RaceAlliance Motorsport in an Aston Martin DBR9 with Karl Wendlinger, scoring one win in Mugello. For 2007 he remained in the FIA GT Championship, but this time for PSI Experience driving a Chevrolet Corvette C6.R with Luke Hines and scoring a second place in Zhuhai. He also ran for JMB Racing in a Maserati MC12 with Joe Macari, Ben Aucott, and Marino Franchitti in the Spa 24 Hours, finishing seventh. He later switched to the GT2 class at Nogaro, running an Advanced Engineering Ferrari F430 with Rui Águas and finishing seventh in class. For the last race of the 2007 season, Peter teamed once again with Luke Hines in an Aston Martin DBR9 for Gigaware Motorsport, but was unable to finish the event. Peter finished 26th in the GT1 Drivers Championship standings and 39th in the GT2 Drivers Championship Standings.

Peter also competed in the 2007 24 Hours of Le Mans with PSI Experience driving a Chevrolet Corvette C6.R with Claude-Yves Gosselin and David Hallyday, finishing 28th overall.

Career Results

Complete Indy Lights Results

Complete 24 Hours of Le Mans results

External links
Official Website
Racing Reference - US Results
Driver Database

1969 births
Austrian racing drivers
FIA GT Championship drivers
Indy Lights drivers
British Formula 3000 Championship drivers
Living people
24 Hours of Le Mans drivers
European Le Mans Series drivers
EFDA Nations Cup drivers
Austrian Formula Three Championship drivers
Porsche Supercup drivers
FIA World Endurance Championship drivers
International GT Open drivers
ADAC GT Masters drivers
24 Hours of Spa drivers
12 Hours of Sebring drivers

Audi Sport drivers
Team Joest drivers
Durango drivers
AF Corse drivers
24H Series drivers